Mermessus bryantae is a species of dwarf spider in the family Linyphiidae. It is found in North America, Cuba, Venezuela, and has been introduced into Azores.

References

Linyphiidae
Articles created by Qbugbot
Spiders described in 1935